Elections to the Renfrew District Council took place in May 1992, alongside elections to the councils of Scotland's various other districts.

Aggregate results

References

Renfrew
Renfrew District Council elections